Birkapılı HES is a privatelly-owned hydroelectric plant in Turkey.

It is to the east of Turkish state highway  which connects Mersin to Karaman.

The dam is on Söğütözü (also called Pirinç Suyu) creek, a tributary of Göksu River. It was taken into operation on 11 March 2004. Its operator is Melike Tekstil.

Technical details
The nominal power of the turbines will be 48.5 MWe. With this power the annual energy production is calculated to be 94 GW-hr.

References

Dams in Mersin Province
Hydroelectric power stations in Turkey
Mut District
Buildings and structures in Mersin Province